"Teenagers" is the fourth and final single and the eleventh track from My Chemical Romance's third studio album, The Black Parade (2006). It was the third United States single from the album, but the fourth released in the United Kingdom, the Philippines, Australia and Canada. The song was released to radio on May 15, 2007.

Despite charting at #67 on the US Billboard Hot 100, "Teenagers" is their highest single on the Pop 100 at #23. It also made number 9 on the UK Singles Chart.

Background
Gerard Way wrote the song after finding himself in a New York City Subway car full of high schoolers who were "running around, being all violent [and] breaking shit", which Way felt was very different from when he was teenager himself. As he told The New York Times, "That was the first time I felt old...I was nervous and I was a target. I felt like I had become a parent figure or part of the problem."

About the relationship between the song and concerns about gun violence, Way said:

Critical reception
A reviewer from NME wrote, "Some bands go out of their way to do a song with a sound they're never bound to do, then release it as a single. They usually fail. My Chemical Romance tried a substantially different sound for this song, and it paid off. The message is simple, the chorus is catchy and Ray Toro's solo joins the chorus and bridge together so smoothly." The song was rated 5 stars in both NME and AbsolutePunk.net and 4/5 from IMDb.

The song was #25 on Rolling Stones list of the 100 Best Songs of 2007. This song was also #80 on MTV Asias list of Top 100 Hits of 2007. The single is certified double Platinum by the RIAA.

Chart performance
The song entered the Bubbling Under Hot 100 Singles chart at #2, before debuting at #87 on the Hot 100 the following week as the "Hot Shot" debut of the week, and peaked at #67. It has reached #23 on the Pop 100, and #13 on Modern Rock Tracks. It also debuted at #42 in the UK, and became the band's fourth straight top 20 hit from The Black Parade and their third top ten hit from the album, peaking at #9. It debuted at number 16 on the ARIA Singles Chart.

Music video
The music video opens with an almost shot-for-shot tribute to the first scene of Pink Floyd's film The Wall.  Further links to The Wall are seen when cheerleaders don gas masks in a similar manner to the masks worn by the teenaged and young adult fans in the film.

The video was posted by the band via their YouTube channel on May 30, 2007, and has since obtained over 153 million views as of February 2022. Sometime around November 1, 2007, the video passed the "Famous Last Words" video as the third most played video on the site. This version of the video cut out the word "shit". The MTV version differs from the YouTube version; notably the teenagers breaking in was cut out, as well as the words "gun", "shit", and "murder". The video debuted on Total Request Live.

This video made its world premiere in New Zealand, which was also the first country in which The Black Parade reached number one. Multiple pirated versions of the video surfaced on the Internet days before the American debut.

The music video version of the song (directed by Marc Webb) seems to have some added audio. During and after the lyrics "They say all teenagers scare the living shit out of me", there are piano notes playing in the background in the style of western music (during live performances, the piano plays along to the music even more so). The album version of the song does not have this piano playing until the coda.

Track listing
All songs written by My Chemical Romance.Version 1 (promotional CD)Version 2 (CD and 7" vinyl)Version 3 (7" vinyl)Version 4 (CD)Version 5 (digital download)'

Charts

Weekly charts

Year-end charts

Certifications

Release history

See also
 Ephebiphobia

References

External links
 

Songs about teenagers
2007 singles
My Chemical Romance songs
The Black Parade (rock opera)
Music videos directed by Marc Webb
Song recordings produced by Rob Cavallo
Reprise Records singles